The 33rd Light Dragoons also known as the Ulster Regiment of Light Dragoons was a cavalry regiment of the British Army. It was raised in 1794, by Colonel James Stevenson Blackwood. It was disbanded shortly afterwards on 26 February 1796.

References

Cavalry regiments of the British Army
Dragoon regiments of the British Army
Dragoons
Light Dragoons